The Miss Brazil 2012 was the 58th edition of the Miss Brazil pageant, was held in Fortaleza on September 29, 2012. The winner was Gabriela Markus who has represented your home country in the 2012 Miss Universe pageant. Twenty six delegates from each state and the Federal District competed for the crown. Current titleholder, Priscila Machado of Rio Grande do Sul, crowned her successor at the end of the event.

Results

Placements

Special Awards
 The winner of the prize Miss Internet would go to semis.

Order of Announcements

Top 10

 Rio de Janeiro
 Espírito Santo
 Ceará
 Rio Grande do Norte
 Minas Gerais
 Santa Catarina
 Distrito Federal
 Amazonas
 Rio Grande do Sul
 São Paulo

Top 7

 Rio Grande do Norte
 Rio Grande do Sul
 Distrito Federal
 São Paulo
 Santa Catarina
 Ceará
 Minas Gerais

Top 5

 Rio Grande do Norte
 Minas Gerais
 Rio Grande do Sul
 Distrito Federal
 São Paulo

Top 3

 Rio Grande do Norte
 Minas Gerais
 Rio Grande do Sul

Contestants 

  - Jéssica Carolina Maia Rodrigues
  - Marina Rijo Alveiro
  - Vannesa Valentini Pereira Henaô
  - Vivian Amorim
  - Ana Bruna Diniz Vals
  - Milena Ornella Ferrer Xavier
  - Tamíris Rodrigues Flazake
  - Fernanda Pereira Da Rocha
  - Herika Noleto Ricardo
  - Juliana Cavalcante Caminho
  - Leticia Marissa Häuch Bonna
  - Karen Recalde Voldijć
  - Thiessa Sickert
  - Layse Souto Dourate
  - Natália Olegaria Oliveira Ragazzo
  - Alessandra Bernardi Von Holzberg
  - Paula Anny Lück Segliatti
  - Jéssica Eberhart Ferreira
  - Rayanne Morais Schramm
  - Kelly Fonsêca Carvalho
  - Gabriela Markus
  - Michele Miquelini Digiossi
  - Karolina Rodrigues Dias
  - Manoella Deschamps Egredin
  - Francine Pataleão Brian
  - Evlen Fontes Lopes
  - Viviane Esmeralda Fragoso Gil

External links
Official Miss Brasil website

2012
2012 in Brazil
2012 beauty pageants